Sara al-Nams is an Algerian author and editor. She was born in 1989 in Tiaret. She studied English at Ferhat Abbas University in Sétif. She currently manages the Algerian publishing house Ajniha. She has authored several books: 
 Love With An Algerian Flavour (2012)
 Water and Salt–Letters to a Palestinian Prisoner (2016)
 J (Dar al-Adab, 2019)

Her latest novel, J, was nominated for the Arabic Booker Prize in 2021.

See also 

 2021 interview with Sara al-Nams by the International Prize for Arabic Fiction

References

 

Algerian women writers
Algerian writers
1989 births
Living people
21st-century Algerian people